Fossilized human footprints were found in the White Sands National Park in New Mexico which were made between 21,000 and 23,000 years ago.

The footprints are located at the shore of an ice age era lake in the Tularosa Basin. As of November 2021, 61 fossil footprints have been found at the site.

References

Tularosa Basin
Fossil trackways in the United States
Pre-Clovis archaeological sites in the Americas